Untypical Story is a 1977 Soviet drama film directed by Grigory Chukhray.

Plot 
The film tells about a Russian woman who lost her husband and eldest son and decides to hide her youngest son in the attic and keep him there until the war ends. But things did not go as she wanted.

Cast 
 Nonna Mordyukova as Matryona
 Vadim Spiridonov as Stepan
 Andrey Nikolaev as Mitya
 Valentina Telichkina as Nina
 Irina Korablyova as Tanya
 Valery Nosik as Grishka
 Vladimir Gusev as Misha
 Galina Mikeladze as Katya
 Arkadi Smirnov as Kornakov
 Vera Kuznetsova as Kornakova
 Ivan Ryzhov as orthodox priest
 Nina Agapova as Faina
 Maria Vinogradova as old woman
 Vladimir Zamansky as military commissar
 Pyotr Todorovsky as episode

References

External links 
 

1977 films
1970s Russian-language films
Soviet drama films
1977 drama films
Films set in Russia
Films set in the Soviet Union
Films directed by Grigori Chukhrai
Mosfilm films
Russian war drama films